Steven James Janaszak (born January 7, 1957) is an American former ice hockey goaltender who played three games in the National Hockey League (NHL) with the Minnesota North Stars and Colorado Rockies between 1980 and 1982.

Amateur career
Janaszak first became known in the hockey world as the star goaltender for Hill-Murray School on the East Side of Saint Paul. Janaszak attended the University of Minnesota where he was a goaltender for the Minnesota Golden Gophers. He was voted most valuable player in the 1979 national championship tournament as the Gophers won the NCAA title. Janaszak is best known for being the back-up goalie to Jim Craig on the Miracle on Ice 1980 U.S. Olympic hockey team that won the gold medal. Janaszak was the only member of the team to not appear in any of the games at the Olympics.

Professional career
Janaszak signed a free agent contract with the North Stars after the Olympics and appeared in one regular season game that season, a solid 2–2 draw against the Buffalo Sabres. Unfortunately for Janaszak, the North Stars already had two quality goaltenders in Gilles Meloche and Gary Edwards, so there was no room for him. After spending the next season in the minor leagues, Janaszak returned to the NHL with the Colorado Rockies, who had signed him as a free agent soon after the end of the 1979-80 season. He also played three games for Team USA as Glenn Resch's backup at the 1982 Ice Hockey World Championship tournament in Helsinki, before retiring from the game after the 1982–83 season.

In popular culture
In the 1981 TV movie about the gold medal-winning U.S. hockey team called Miracle on Ice, Janaszak does not appear as a character, but rather in archival footage of the gold medal ceremony.

He is played by Sam Skoryna in the 2004 Disney film Miracle.

Life outside sports
He met his future wife, who was working as an interpreter during the 1980 Olympics in the athlete village, and they were married a year later. He works as an investment manager on Long Island, N.Y.

Career statistics

Regular season and playoffs

International

Awards and achievements

References

External links

1959 births
1980 US Olympic ice hockey team
American men's ice hockey goaltenders
Baltimore Clippers (1979–81) players
Colorado Rockies (NHL) players
Fort Wayne Komets players
Fort Worth Texans players
Ice hockey people from Saint Paul, Minnesota
Ice hockey players at the 1980 Winter Olympics
Living people
Medalists at the 1980 Winter Olympics
Minnesota Golden Gophers men's ice hockey players
Minnesota North Stars players
Oklahoma City Stars players
Olympic gold medalists for the United States in ice hockey
Tulsa Oilers (1964–1984) players
Undrafted National Hockey League players
Wichita Wind players
NCAA men's ice hockey national champions